Aerobic vaginitis (AV) is a form of vaginitis first described by Donders et al. in 2002. It is characterized by a more or less severe disruption of the lactobacillary flora, along with inflammation, atrophy, and the presence of a predominantly aerobic microflora, composed of enteric commensals or pathogens.

It is the aerobic counterpart of bacterial vaginosis. The lack of acknowledgement of the difference between the two conditions might have led to inaccurate conclusions in several studies in the past. The entity that has been described as "desquamative inflammatory vaginitis" probably corresponds to the more severe forms of aerobic vaginitis.

Signs and symptoms
Women with aerobic vaginitis usually have a thinned reddish vaginal mucosa, sometimes with extensive erosions or ulcerations and abundant yellowish discharge (without the fishy amine odour, typical of bacterial vaginosis). The pH is usually high. Symptoms can include burning, stinging and dyspareunia. The symptoms can last for long periods—sometimes even years. Typically, patients have been treated several times with antimycotic and antibiotic drugs without relief. In asymptomatic cases, there is microscopic evidence but no symptoms. The prevalence of asymptomatic cases is unknown.

Complications
Aerobic vaginitis has been associated with several gynecological and obstetrical complications, including:

 Premature rupture of membranes 
 Preterm labour 
 Ascending chorioamnionitis.
 Increased risk to acquire sexually transmitted infections (including HIV)
 Abnormal Pap test results

Diagnosis

The diagnosis is based on microscopic criteria. Ideally, phase-contrast microscopy is used with a magnification of 400x (high-power field) or by Gram stain. For scoring purposes, along with  relative number of leucocytes, percentage of toxic leucocytes, background flora and proportion of epitheliocytes, lactobacillary grade must be evaluated:

grade I
numerous pleiomorphic lactobacilli; no other bacteria
grade IIa
mixed flora, but predominantly lactobacilli
grade IIb
mixed flora, but proportion of lactobacilli severely decreased because of an increased number of other bacteria
grade III
lactobacilli severely depressed or absent because of overgrowth of other bacteria

The "AV score" is calculated according to what is described in the table.
 AV score <3: no signs of AV
 AV score 3 or 4: light AV
 AV score 5 or 6: moderate AV
 AV score ≥7:severe AV. 
pH measurement alone is not enough for the diagnosis.

Treatment
Treatment is not always easy and aims at correcting the three key changes encountered in aerobic vaginitis: the presence of atrophy, inflammation and abnormal flora. The treatment can include topical steroids to diminish the inflammation and topical estrogen to reduce the atrophy. The use and choice of antibiotics to diminish the load/proportion of aerobic bacteria is still a matter of debate. The use of local antibiotics, preferably local non-absorbed and broad spectrum, covering enteric gram-positive and gram-negative aerobes, like kanamycin can be an option. In some cases, systemic antibiotics can be helpful, such as amoxyclav or moxifloxacin. Vaginal rinsing with povidone iodine can provide rapid relief of symptoms but does not provide long-term reduction of bacterial loads. Dequalinium chloride can also be an option for treatment.

Epidemiology

About 5 to 10% of women are affected by aerobic vaginitis. Reports in pregnant women point to a prevalence of 8.3–10.8%.

When considering symptomatic women, the prevalence of AV can be as high as 23%.

References

External links 

Inflammatory diseases of female pelvic organs
Vagina